Steven James Keillor (born April 25, 1948) is a Minnesota historian and author. He received his B.A., M.A., and Ph.D in American History from the University of Minnesota; currently, he is an adjunct professor at Bethel University. He lives in Askov, Minnesota and is the brother of Garrison Keillor .

Bibliography

References

External links 
 Keillor's website

Living people
Writers from Minnesota
21st-century American historians
21st-century American male writers
Historians of the United States
American people of Scottish descent
University of Minnesota College of Liberal Arts alumni
1948 births
Bethel University (Minnesota) faculty
Historians from Minnesota
American male non-fiction writers